Valery Lavrushkin (born 17 March 1945) is a Soviet speed skater. He competed at the 1968 Winter Olympics and the 1972 Winter Olympics.

References

1945 births
Living people
Soviet male speed skaters
Olympic speed skaters of the Soviet Union
Speed skaters at the 1968 Winter Olympics
Speed skaters at the 1972 Winter Olympics
Sportspeople from Tula, Russia